Petropavlovka is a rural locality (a selo) in Maloivanovskoye Rural Settlement, Dubovsky District, Volgograd Oblast, Russia. The population was 84 as of 2010.

Geography 
Petropavlovka is located in steppe, on the left bank of the Berdiya River, 66 km northwest of Dubovka (the district's administrative centre) by road. Ust-Pogozhye is the nearest rural locality.

References 

Rural localities in Dubovsky District, Volgograd Oblast